Luca Robert Lewis (born February 22, 2001) is an American professional soccer player who plays as a goalkeeper.

Career

Youth
Lewis began playing with the IMG Academy in Florida in 2015, before moving to Italy to play with Serie A side Torino's academy.

New York Red Bulls II
Lewis returned to the United States on September 22, 2020, joining USL Championship side New York Red Bulls II. He made his debut on September 26, 2020, starting in a 5–4 win over Philadelphia Union II.

New York Red Bulls
On December 11, 2020, Lewis made the move to New York's MLS roster ahead of their 2021 season. Following the 2021 season, New York declined their contract option on Lewis.

References

External links
Luca Lewis | New York Red Bulls

2001 births
Living people
New York Red Bulls II players
New York Red Bulls players
USL Championship players
American soccer players
Association football goalkeepers
Soccer players from New York City
American expatriate soccer players
American expatriate sportspeople in Italy
Expatriate footballers in Italy